"For Those in Peril on the Sea" (also known as "The Lost Island of Munga" and "A High-Sea Adventure") is an episode of the British comedy television series The Goodies. The episode name is a reference to a verse from the 1860 hymn, "Eternal Father, Strong to Save." The episode was written by The Goodies, with songs and music by Bill Oddie.

Plot
The Goodies decide to set out in a small boat to search for the Lost Island of Munga.  Bill wants to go on the voyage as a pirate, Graeme decides to go as a Viking and Tim goes as a captain.

They have problems at sea, but 'rescue' comes in the form of a large ship which turns out be an oil tanker.

The Goodies are welcomed by the oil millionaire.  They pretend to be sailors, and almost get away with their imposture.  However, they are let down by their ignorance that sailors' bell-bottom trousers have real bells attached to them and none of the Goodies are able to lower their singing voices to reach the deepest and lowest note of the verse of the song There Is Nothing Like a Dame.  Then Tim, Graeme and Bill are tossed overboard.

The Goodies swim ashore and find that they have reached the Lost Island of Munga, where strange natives are dumping sliced potatoes into the sea. The Goodies investigate the beach cabin and meet the property developer.  To the Goodies' horror they discover the millionaire and the developer is their old enemy, the "Music Master" (who is now going by the name "Nasty Person"), and his servant "Gerald".

Nasty Person plans to fill the oceans with potato slices and oil; once saturated, he'll light a match o the mixture and there'll be fish and chips everywhere!!!  The Goodies also discover that Nasty Person has set up a tourist trade on the island and that the local people are all working for him, so Graeme tricks Nasty Person with a pencil that contains poison gas and locks him in a cupboard.

As The Goodies try to think up a plan to save Munga, Graeme remembers reading his book about Vikings who are caught by a storm, so the trio and the natives perform the rain dance and are blown away by the strong wind and return home.

Notes
 This episode is a sequel to The Goodies' episode "The Music Lovers"

References

 "The Complete Goodies" — Robert Ross, B T Batsford, London, 2000
 "The Goodies Rule OK" — Robert Ross, Carlton Books Ltd, Sydney, 2006
 "From Fringe to Flying Circus — 'Celebrating a Unique Generation of Comedy 1960-1980'" — Roger Wilmut, Eyre Methuen Ltd, 1980
 "The Goodies Episode Summaries" — Brett Allender
 "The Goodies — Fact File" — Matthew K. Sharp

External links
 

The Goodies (series 3) episodes
1973 British television episodes